Hattfjelldal Church is a parish church of the Church of Norway in Hattfjelldal Municipality in Nordland county, Norway. It is located in the village of Hattfjelldal. It is the main church for the Hattfjelldal parish which is part of the Indre Helgeland prosti (deanery) in the Diocese of Sør-Hålogaland. The white, wooden church was built in a long church style in 1869 using plans drawn up by the architect Jakob Nilsen Hagen. The church seats about 200 people.

History

The present church is the third church building on this site. The first small chapel was built in 1727. That one was replaced in 1788 by a larger chapel. The present church was constructed in 1868 on a plot of land a short distance to the north of the old church. The new building was consecrated on 12 August 1869 by Bishop Waldemar Hvoslef. The old church was torn down in 1874. The church was renovated in 1958, led by the architect John Egil Tverdahl. The architect Nils Toft renovated the sacristy in 1966.

See also
List of churches in Sør-Hålogaland

References

Hattfjelldal
Churches in Nordland
Wooden churches in Norway
19th-century Church of Norway church buildings
Churches completed in 1869
1727 establishments in Norway
Long churches in Norway